The 2010–11 season was the 42nd campaign of the Scottish Men's National League, the national basketball league of Scotland. The season featured 10 teams, including four new teams from the previous season; Stirling Knights, Dunfermline Reign, Glasgow University and the second team of BBL side Glasgow Rocks joined the league. City of Edinburgh Kings won their 8th league title.

Teams

The line-up for the 2010-2011 season features the following teams:
City of Edinburgh Kings
Clark Eriksson Fury
Dunfermline Reign
East Lothian Peregrines
Glasgow Rocks II
Glasgow Storm
Glasgow University
St Mirren Reid Kerr College
Stirling Knights
Troon Tornadoes

League table

Playoffs
Final

References

Scottish Basketball Championship Men seasons
Scot
Scot
basketball
basketball